Nordenstamia is a genus of flowering plants in the family Asteraceae.

It is native range stretches from Ecuador, Bolivia and Peru to north-western Argentina.

The genus name of Nordenstamia is in honour of Bertil Nordenstam (b. 1936), a Swedish botanist and professor emeritus at the Swedish Museum of Natural History in the Department of Phanerogamic Botany. 
It was first described and published in Compositae Newslett. Vol.44 on page 15 in 2006.

Known species
According to Kew:

References

Senecioneae
Asteraceae genera
Plants described in 1993
Flora of Ecuador
Flora of Bolivia
Flora of Peru
Flora of Northwest Argentina